is a railway station on the IR Ishikawa Railway Line in Kanazawa, Ishikawa, Japan, operated by the third-sector railway operator IR Ishikawa Railway.

Lines
Through trains to and from the Ainokaze Toyama Railway Line and JR West Nanao Line also operate over this line.

Layout
The station consists of a side platform (platform 1) and island platform (platforms 2 and 3) serving a total of three tracks, with the station building located above the platforms. The station is staffed.

Platforms

Adjacent stations

History
The station opened on 1 November 1911. With the privatization of JNR on 1 April 1987, the station came under the control of JR West. From this date, Morimoto Station was transferred to the ownership of the third-sector operating company IR Ishikawa Railway.

Surrounding area
 
 Kanazawa Koyo High School
 Ishikawa Prefectural School for Students with Special Needs

Passenger statistics
In fiscal 2015, the station was used by an average of 1,648 passengers daily (boarding passengers only).

See also
 List of railway stations in Japan

References

External links

  

Railway stations in Ishikawa Prefecture
Railway stations in Japan opened in 1911
IR Ishikawa Railway Line